Golspie Sutherland Football Club are a senior association football club from Golspie, Sutherland in the Scottish Highlands. They compete in the North Caledonian Football League and are licensed members of the Scottish Football Association, playing in the Scottish Cup each season. 

The team play their home matches at King George V Park.

With ten championship wins to their credit, Golspie are the most successful club currently competing in the North Caledonian League.

Honours
North Caledonian League
Champions: 1974–75, 1975–76, 1992–93, 1998–99, 2003–04, 2006–07, 2007–08, 2008–09, 2014–15, 2018–19, 2020–21

North Caledonian Cup 
Winners: 1968–69, 1974–75, 1975–76, 2000–01, 2002–03, 2007–08, 2015–16, 2016–17

Football Times Cup 
Winners: 1968–69, 2004–05, 2012–13, 2013–14, 2014–15

Jock Mackay Cup 
Winners: 2007–08, 2009–10, 2012–13, 2013–14, 2015–16

Chic Allan Cup  
Winners: 1974–75, 1975–76, 1999–00, 2000–01, 2001–02

Ness Cup  
Winners: 1971–72, 1974–75, 1975–76, 2013–14

Morris Newton / SWL Cup 
Winners: 1992–93, 2000–01, 2001–02, 2007–08, 2008–09, 2014–15

External links
 Website
 Facebook

References

Football clubs in Scotland
Football in Highland (council area)
North Caledonian Football League teams
Association football clubs established in 1877
1877 establishments in Scotland
Sport in Sutherland
Golspie